Revolutionary Communist Party may refer to:
Revolutionary Communist Party of Argentina
Revolutionary Communist Party (Belgium)
Revolutionary Communist Party (Brazil)
Voltaic Revolutionary Communist Party
Revolutionary Communist Party of Canada
Revolutionary Communist Party (Organizing Committees)
Revolutionary Communist Party (Chile)
Revolutionary Communist Party of China
Revolutionary Communist Party of Côte d'Ivoire
Revolutionary Communist Party (India)
Revolutionary Communist Party of India
Revolutionary Communist Party of India (Das)
Revolutionary Communist Party of India (Tagore)
Revolutionary Communist Party – Red Trench
Revolutionary Communist Party (Working Class)
Revolutionary Communist Party (Spain)
Revolutionary Communist Party (Turkey)
Revolutionary Communist Party of Turkey
Revolutionary Communist Party (UK, 1944)
Revolutionary Communist Party (UK, 1978)
Revolutionary Communist Party of Britain (Marxist–Leninist)
Revolutionary Communist Party, USA

See also
Communist Vanguard of the Revolutionary Workers' Party
Communist Revolutionary Party (France)
Communist Revolutionary Party of France
Communist Party of Revolutionary Marxists
Revolutionary Palestinian Communist Party
Party of Revolutionary Communism
Sudanese Communist Party – Revolutionary Leadership
Communist Party of Turkey – Revolutionary Wing